The Sadleirian Professorship of Pure Mathematics, originally spelled in the statutes and for the first two professors as Sadlerian, is a professorship in pure mathematics within the DPMMS at the University of Cambridge. It was founded on a bequest from Lady Mary Sadleir for lectureships "for the full and clear explication and teaching that part of mathematical knowledge commonly called algebra". She died in 1706 and lectures began in 1710 but eventually these failed to attract undergraduates. In 1860 the foundation was used to establish the professorship. On 10 June 1863 Arthur Cayley was elected with the statutory duty "to explain and teach the principles of pure mathematics, and to apply himself to the advancement of that science." The stipend attached to the professorship was modest although it improved in the course of subsequent legislation.

List of Sadlerian Lecturers of Pure Mathematics
1746–1769 William Ludlam
1826–1835 Lawrence Stephenson

List of Sadleirian Lecturers of Pure Mathematics
1845–1847 Arthur Scratchley
1847–1857 George Ferns Reyner
1851 Stephen Hanson
1855–1858 William Charles Green
1857–1864 John Robert Lunn

List of Sadleirian Professors of Pure Mathematics
1863–1895 Arthur Cayley
1895–1910 Andrew Russell Forsyth
1910–1931 E. W. Hobson
1931–1942 G. H. Hardy
1945–1953 Louis Mordell
1953–1967 Philip Hall
1967–1986 J. W. S. Cassels
1986–2012 John H. Coates
2013–2014 Vladimir Markovic
2017– Emmanuel Breuillard

References

Sources
 Obituary Notices of Fellows Deceased. (1895). Proceedings of the Royal Society of London, 58, I-Lx. Retrieved from https://www.jstor.org/stable/115800 (Obituary of Arthur Cayley written by Andrew Forsyth).
 University of Cambridge DPMMS https://web.archive.org/web/20160624155328/http://www.admin.cam.ac.uk/offices/academic/secretary/professorships/sadleirian.pdf

 
Pure Mathematics, Sadleirian
Faculty of Mathematics, University of Cambridge
Pure Mathematics, Sadleirian, Cambridge
Mathematics education in the United Kingdom